The Nafana are a Senufo people living in the central north-west of Ghana and the north-east of Côte d'Ivoire, in the area east of Bondoukou. They number about 45, 000 (SIL/GILLBT 1992) and they speak Nafaanra, a Senufo language. They are surrounded by Gur speakers to the north, the isolated Mande speaking Ligbi people to the east, and the Akan speaking Abron to the south.

The Nafana people relate that they come from Côte d'Ivoire, from a village called Kakala. According to Jordan (1978), their oral history says that some of their people are still there, and if they go back they would not be allowed to leave again. They arrived in the Banda area after the Ligbi people, who according to Stahl (2004) came from Bigu (Begho, Bighu) to the area in the early 17th century. Some major towns of the Nafana people are Sampa, Kokoa, Duadaso No 1, Duadaso No 2, Jamera, and Kabile which are in the Jaman North District. Brodi and Debibi are in the Tain District. Banda Ahenkro in the Banda District. The people are mainly farmers. Their major festival is the Songhei Festival mainly original in Jamala or Jamera celebrated annually. The Nafana people are the real who can trace their origins from the Songhai empire. Their main culture heritage town is Jamera where all their history and traditions are based.

Bibliography 
Pitt, Walter (1926) 'The Mfantera or Frantomafo meaning those who wear clothes', Gold Coast Review 2/1: 71–77.
Stahl, Ann (2004). "Making history in Banda: Reflections on the construction of Africa's past", in Historical Archaeology, 38, 1, 50–56.

Ethnic groups in Ghana
Ethnic groups in Ivory Coast